Jackson is an unincorporated community in Union County, North Carolina, United States; named in honor of Andrew Jackson, who was born near the area.  It is located southwest of Monroe, at the intersection of NC 200 (Lancaster Highway) and Potter Road.

It is not to be confused with the larger town of Jackson.

References

Unincorporated communities in Union County, North Carolina
Unincorporated communities in North Carolina